Hellabad (also Romanized as Helābād; also known as Gilyabad) is a village in Fuladlui Jonubi Rural District, Hir District, Ardabil County, Ardabil Province, Iran. At the 2006 census, its population was 137, in 32 families.

References 

Tageo

Towns and villages in Ardabil County